This is a list of butterflies of the Amazon River basin and the Andes.

The Amazon River basin may be the most speciose region for butterflies. Nine countries have territory in the Amazon River basin or immediately adjoin this region: Brazil, Bolivia, Peru, Ecuador, Colombia, Venezuela, Guyana, Suriname, and French Guiana. The Andes extends from north to south through seven South American countries: Venezuela, Colombia, Ecuador, Peru, Bolivia, Chile, and Argentina. The fauna of the Andes is also diverse. Both regions have many endemic species. South America as a whole constitutes the Neotropical realm. Habitats in these two regions are very various and include Amazon rainforest, Atlantic forest, Llanos grasslands, Puna grassland and Valdivian temperate rain forest. Peru east of the Andes is regarded as the most important biodiversity hotspot in the world. The two regions (Amazon and Andes) are South America proper excluding the pampas plains of Uruguay and Paraguay which have a distinct butterfly fauna.

Isolation  has led to the evolution of endemic higher taxa. Instances are Ithomiinae, Dismorphiinae,  Phyciodina, Pyrrhopygini, Eumaeini (over 1,000 species), Pronophilina and Eudaminae. Endemic genera (among very many) include Morpho, Agrias, Prepona Caligo, Cithaerias, Catagramma, Parides, Hamadryas, Nessaea, Marpesia, Melanis Mesosemia, Symmachia, Evenus, Memphis, Pierella, and Astraptes. Other higher taxa are most speciose in the Neotropics, for instance Riodininae. Many species, notably Heliconius, are members of complex mimicry rings. Adaptive radiation has led to many species being geographically diverse. Examples are Consul fabius and Mechanitis lysimnia.

Notable entomologists associated with Neotropical butterflies are Jean-Baptiste Godart, Henry Walter Bates, William Chapman Hewitson, Hans Fruhstorfer, Otto Staudinger, Karl Jordan and Walter Rothschild, Anton Hermann Fassl, Hermann Burmeister, William Schaus, Eugène Le Moult, Richard Haensch, Gustav Weymer, Ferdinand Heinrich Hermann Strecker, Andrey Avinoff, Carlos Berg, and Vladimir Nabokov.

Papilionidae

Papilioninae

Riodinidae

Pieridae

Coliadinae

Dismorphiinae

Pierinae

Lycaenidae

Polyommatinae

Theclinae

Nymphalidae

Apaturinae

Biblidinae

Charaxinae

Cyrestinae

Danainae

Heliconiinae

Libytheinae

Limenitidinae

Morphinae

Nymphalinae

Satyrinae

Hesperiidae

Hesperiinae

Pyrginae

Eudaminae

Pyrrhopyginae

References 

Bernard d'Abrera, 1981-1995 Butterflies of the Neotropical Region Hill House/Lansdowne Melbourne in association with E.W. Classey Part1 1981 Papilionidae. Pieridae ; part 2 1984 Danaidae, Ithomiidae, Heliconidae & Morphidae  ; 19- part 3 Brassolidae, Acraeidae, Nymphalidae (partim) plus corrections to Parts I and II  ; part 4 1987 Nymphalidae (partim) including Callicore, Asterope, Agrias and Prepona ; part 5 (Nymphalidae (concl.), Anaea (Memphis) Satyridae (complete), Libytheidae)ISBN ? ; part 6 1994 Riodinidae ; part 7 1995 Lycaenidae 
 Andrade-C., M. Gonzalo. Biodiversidad de las Mariposas (Lepidoptera: Rhopalocera) de Colombia. pp. 153–172. In: Proyecto de Red Iberoamericana de Biogeografía y Entomología Sistemática PrIBES 2002. Costa. C., Vanin, S. A., Lobo, J. M. & Melic, A. (Eds.) Monografías Tercer Milenio, vol. 2, SEA, Zaragoza, Julio-2002.
 Bollino, M., & Onore, G. (2001). Mariposas del Ecuador / Butterflies of Ecuador: Vol. 10a. Familia: Papilionidae. Quito: Pontificia Universidad Católica del Ecuador. 
 Garwood, K. M., Lehman, Carter, W., & Carter, G. (2007). Butterflies of Southern Amazonia. Mission, Texas: Neotropical Butterflies. 
 Lacomme, D., & Manil, L. (Eds.). (2002). Lépidoptères de Guyane. Paris: Association des Lépidopteristes Parisiens.
 Lamas, G. (Ed.). (2004). Atlas of Neotropical Lepidoptera. Checklist: Part 4A. Hesperioidea-Papilionoidea. Gainesville: Association for Tropical Lepidoptera. 094541728 (v. 5A)
 Lamas, G. Bibliography of butterflies; An Annocated Bibliography of the Neotropical Butterflies and Skipper (Lepididoptera: Papilionoidea and Hesperioidea) Revised Electronic Edition (2007) 
Mittermeier, R. A., P. R. Gil, and C. G. Mittermeier 1999. Megadiversity: Earth's Biologically Wealthiest Nations. Conservation International, USA. 501 pp.
 Neild, A. F. E. (1997). The butterflies of Venezuela. Pt. 1. Nymphalidae I (Limenitidinae, Apaturinae, Charaxinae). Greenwich, UK: Meridian Publ.
Adalbert Seitz Die Großschmetterlinge der Erde, Verlag Alfred Kernen, Stuttgart Band 5 Die exotischen Großschmetterlinge, Die Großschmetterlinge des amerikanischen Faunengebietes, 1907-1927 pdf text 6+1 parts plates online (other formats available) at Biodiversity Heritage Library
 Tyler, H. A., Brown, K. S., Jr., & Wilson, K. (1994). Swallowtail Butterflies of the Americas: A Study in Biological Dynamics, Ecological Diversity, Biosystematics, and Conservation. Gainesville: Scientific Publishers.

External links

Butterflies of the Americas
 Willmott, K.R., & Hall, J.P.W. (2008). Butterflies of Ecuador.
Butterflies of the Amazon and Andes

'
'
'
°Amazon basin and Andes
Lepidoptera of Brazil
Lepidoptera of Colombia
Lepidoptera of Venezuela